The World Group Play-offs were four ties which involved the losing nations of the World Group first round and the winning nations of the World Group II. Nations that won their play-off ties entered the 2012 World Group, while losing nations joined the 2012 World Group II.

Germany vs. United States

Spain vs. France

Slovakia vs. Serbia

Australia vs. Ukraine

References

See also
Fed Cup structure

World Group Play-offs